Third Degree is the third studio album by the American supergroup Flying Colors, released on October 4, 2019 via Mascot Label Group.

The album was released on digital platforms and also on CD digipack, a limited-edition double-LP, a 180g blue or black vinyl and a limited-edition box set with bonus content such as a 40-page photobook, two coasters and a bonus disc with six bonus songs.

Third Degree's first single and video, "More", was released as the band revealed the album's title, cover and tracklist. The second single, "You Are Not Alone", was released on August 28, 2019. The third, pop rock single "Love Letter", was released on September 12 and the final single, "The Loss Inside", about the process of grieving, had its video premiered on September 30, 2019.

Recording and song information 
The album's first sessions took place as early as December 2016, at guitarist Steve Morse's studio in Florida, United States, when seven songs were written. The band wouldn't meet again until December 2018, when three other songs were created. By then, drummer and vocalist Mike Portnoy was already recording his parts at keyboardist and vocalist Neal Morse's studio in Nashville.

"The Loss Inside" is the only song of the album tuned in drop D. Vocalist and guitarist Casey McPherson commented that the song allows him to use "soul" vocals and Steve and Neal to work on "their own version of rock and roll".

"More" is a song about the desperation for "freedom from addiction, consumerism, and lust". McPherson saw "Cadence" as "one of those songs that is such a classic 'product' of us. A strong mix of each of our creative energies in each section to create what we are."

"Last Train Home" was built upon a musical idea that Steve saved for the band. He commented: "I always tend toward a kind of triumphant feel when I do instrumental sections... possibly because I listened to a lot of classical music over the years." He used a 12-string guitar and many "jangly clean guitars with open strings".

Bassist Dave LaRue saw Geronimo as "a bit of a departure for Flying Colors" and it reminded him of Steely Dan. "You Are Not Alone" was seen by McPherson as a follow up to Second Nature's "Peaceful Harbor". He wrote the song about the effects of Hurricane Harvey in his hometown of Austin, Texas and his experience rescuing victims.

McPherson described "Love Letter" as influenced by The Beach Boys, The Beatles, Jellyfish, ELO, Silverchair. It received a '60s/'70s-inspired psychedelic video.

Track listing

Critical reception
Loudwire named Third Degree one of the 50 best rock albums of 2019.

Sonic Perspectives called the album "a mature, consistent third album which is melodically strong and diverse." and added "This makes for one of the best rock/pop/prog bands of the decade, and is a big colorful feather in the cap of its illustrious members."

The bonus track, Waiting for the Sun, also received praise as Heaven's Metal called the song, "another perfect example of the concerted band effort so prominent on this release. This smooth textured, light-rock anthem, with plenty of guitar flare and lyrical color, is easily worthy of the main release."

Personnel
Flying Colors
 Casey McPherson – lead vocals, guitar
 Neal Morse – vocals, keyboards, acoustic guitar
 Mike Portnoy – drums, percussion, handclaps, vocals
 Steve Morse – lead guitar
 Dave LaRue – bass guitar

Production
 Flying Colors – production
 Bill Evans – executive producer, HPAR, post-production engineer
 Rich Mouser – mixing, mastering
 Jerry Guidroz – recording engineer
 Brian Moritz – recording engineer
 Thomas Cuce – recording engineer
 Matthew Parmenter – recording engineer
 Bouchra Azizy – additional digital editing
 Chris Carmichael – strings, string arrangement

Charts

References

2019 albums
Flying Colors (band) albums